Adolph Kußmaul (22 February 1822 – 28 May 1902) was a German physician and a leading clinician of his time. He was born as the son and grandson of physicians at Graben near Karlsruhe and studied at Heidelberg. He entered the army after graduation and spent two years as an army surgeon. This was followed by a period as a general practitioner before he went to Würzburg to study for his doctorate under Virchow.

He was subsequently Professor of Medicine at Heidelberg (1857), Erlangen (1859), Freiburg (1859) and Straßburg (1876).

Beyond his medical skills he was also active in literature. He is regarded as one of the creators of the term Biedermeier.

He died in Heidelberg.

Eponymous terms
His name continues to be used in eponyms. He described two medical signs and one disease which have eponymous names that remain in use:
 Kussmaul breathing - Very deep and labored breathing with normal, rapid or reduced frequency seen in severe Diabetic ketoacidosis (DKA).
 Kussmaul's sign - Paradoxical rise in the Jugular venous pressure (JVP) on inhalation in Constrictive pericarditis or Chronic obstructive pulmonary disease (COPD).
 Kussmaul disease (Also called Kussmaul-Maier disease) - Polyarteritis nodosa. Named with Rudolf Robert Maier (1824-1888).
The following eponymous terms are considered archaic:
 Kussmaul's coma - diabetic coma due to ketoacidosis.
 Kussmaul's aphasia - selective mutism.

Firsts
 First to describe dyslexia in 1877. (He called it 'word blindness'.)
 First to describe polyarteritis nodosa.
 First to describe progressive bulbar paralysis.
 First to describe selective mutism. 
 First to diagnose mesenteric embolism.
 First to perform pleural tapping and gastric lavage.
 First to attempt oesophagoscopy and gastroscopy.
 First to describe the emotional symptoms of mercury exposure as a first stage preceding the physical effects.

References

External links
Adolf Kussmaul, biography from Who Named It?.

1822 births
1902 deaths
History of medical imaging
People from Karlsruhe (district)
Physicians from Baden-Württemberg
German surgeons
People from the Grand Duchy of Baden
Academic staff of the University of Erlangen-Nuremberg
Academic staff of the University of Strasbourg